Cupp may refer to:

 Cupp (surname), includes a list of people with the name
 Centre for Underground Physics in Pyhäsalmi (CUPP), an underground physics laboratory located in Pyhäjärvi, Finland
 Patrick D. Cupp Stadium (also Cupp Stadium), a multi-use stadium in Radford, Virginia on the campus of Radford University

See also